The Bandit's Waterloo is a 1908 silent American drama film directed by  D. W. Griffith.

Cast
 Charles Inslee as Bandit leader
 Linda Arvidson as Accomplice / Woman at Inn
 Marion Leonard as Kidnapped woman
 Harry Solter as Police Sergeant
 Arthur V. Johnson
 Florence Lawrence

See also
 D. W. Griffith filmography
 List of American films of 1908

References

1908 films
1908 drama films
Silent American drama films
Films directed by D. W. Griffith
American silent short films
American black-and-white films
1908 short films
1900s American films
1900s English-language films
American drama short films